Uprooting is a form of treefall in which the root plate of a tree is torn from the soil, disrupting and mixing it and leaving a pit-mound.

Transplanting
Small trees can be replanted if their root system is well attached to the trunk. Trees can suffer from transplant shock when moved to new environment, and that causes the tree not to be able to root itself properly.

References

Trees
Horticulture
Forest ecology